Juhan Tõrvand (25 November 1883 Laatre Parish (now Mulgi Parish), Kreis Wolmar – 12 May 1942 Verkhnekamsky District, Kirov Oblast, Russian SFSR) was an Estonian military Major General and sports figure.

In 1906 he graduated from Vilnius Military School and after that in General Staff Academy. He participated in World War I and the Russian Civil War in the White Army. In 1920 he returned to Estonia. Since 1925 he was Chief of Staff of Headquarters of the Estonian Defence Forces.

He was also active in Estonian sport life. From 1927 until 1935, he was the head of the Estonian Sports Association Kalev.

Death
Following the Soviet occupation of Estonia, Tõrvand and his family were arrested during the June deportations on 14 June 1941. Tõrvand was convicted by a tribunal and placed within the gulag camp system. He died of pneumonia on 12 May 1942 in Vyatlag camp in Kirov Oblast.

Awards
 1933: Order of the Cross of the Eagle, Class I.

References

1883 births
1942 deaths
People from Mulgi Parish
People from Kreis Wolmar
Estonian military personnel
Imperial Russian Army personnel
Russian military personnel of World War I
White movement people
20th-century Estonian military personnel
Estonian people in sports
Recipients of the Military Order of the Cross of the Eagle, Class I
People who died in the Gulag
Estonian people who died in Soviet detention